Eugoa gracilisa is a moth of the family Erebidae. It is found in western Malaysia.

References

 Natural History Museum Lepidoptera generic names catalog

gracilisa
Moths described in 2008